Krokamargit is a Swedish island belonging to the Piteå archipelago. The island is located in a bay (Margitviken) between Nötön and Renön, where both islands have not yet permanently grown together further south. Krokamargit has no shore connection and there are some summer houses on it.

References 

Islands of Sweden